MacGaffin and McGaffin are Northern Irish surnames. They are Anglicisations of the Irish language Mac Eacháin, meaning "son of Eachán".  The personal name Eachán is a diminutive of the personal name Eachaidh, which is based upon the Gaelic each, meaning "horse".

References

Anglicised Irish-language surnames
Patronymic surnames